Lei Papale (foaled 28 January 2017) is a Japanese Thoroughbred racehorse. She did not race as a juvenile, but as a three-year-old in 2020 she was unbeaten in five starts including the Grade 3 Challenge Cup. On her first run of 2021 she took the Grade 1 Osaka Hai.

Background
Lei Papale is a "lightly built" bay mare bred in Japan by Northern Farm. She was sent into training with Tomokazu Takano and raced in the green, white and red colours of the Northern Farm affiliate U Carrot Farm. She usually races in a hood.

She was from the ninth crop of foals sired by Deep Impact, who was the Japanese Horse of the Year in 2005 and 2006, winning races including the Tokyo Yushun, Tenno Sho, Arima Kinen and Japan Cup. Deep Impact's other progeny include Gentildonna, Harp Star, Kizuna, A Shin Hikari, Marialite and Saxon Warrior. Lei Papale's dam Shells Lei won three of her twenty-one starts, finished second in both the Tulip Sho and Rose Stakes and ran fifth in the Oka Sho and the Shuka Sho. As a broodmare she had previously produced the Hopeful Stakes winner Shining Lei. She was one of numerous notable Japanese horses descended from the imported British broodmare Florries Cup.

Racing career

2020: three-year-old season
Lei Papale was ridden in all of her 2020 races by Yuga Kawada. She made her first appearance in a 1600-metre race for previously unraced three-year-old on firm ground at Kyoto Racecourse on 11 January when she started the 1.7/1 favourite and won by two lengths from White Lodge. After an absence of almost five months, the filly returned for a minor race over 1600 metres at Hanshin Racecourse on 6 June and won by a length from Oh My Darling. In July she was stepped up in distance and won again, coming home two lengths clear of the four-year-old Cantor in the Itoigawa Tokubetsu over 1800 metres at Niigata Racecourse.

On 18 October Lei Papale began her autumn campaign in the Ohara Stakes, an 1800 metres handicap at Kyoto and started the 0.9/1 favourite in a thirteen-runner field. Carrying 52 kg she led from the start and came home two lengths clear of Satono Wizard. For her final run of the year the filly was stepped up in class and distance for the Grade 3 Challenge Cup over 2000 metres at Hanshin and started the 0.6/1 favourite against ten opponents including Bravas (winner of the Niigata Kinen), Lord Quest (Swan Stakes) and Generale Uno (St Lite Kinen). After tracking the front-running Generale Uno, Lei Papale took the lead entering the straight and won by one and a half lengths from Bravas. Tomokazu Takano later commented "It was her first try at graded level... as well as the distance of 2,000 meters with four corners in the race, but she passed that test well".

2021: four-year-old season
For her first appearance as a four-year-old Lei Papale was stepped up to the highest class to contest the Grade 1 Osaka Hai over 2000 metres at Hanshin on 4 April. In the build-up to the race Takano said "She's a horse with a lot of power and potential. It's important that she runs with a good rhythm, even though I think she can race from any position. She comes to the race fresh... I'm very excited to see what she can achieve". With Kawada in the saddle she started the 11.2/1 fourth choice in the betting behind Contrail, Gran Alegria and Salios in a thirteen-runner field which also included Wagnerian, Persian Knight (Mile Championship), Bravas and Mozu Bello (Nikkei Shinshun Hai). Lei Papale set the pace from the start, switched left to race down the centre of the track in the straight and drew away in the closing stages to win by four lengths from Contrail. Kawada commented "I had always believed in her outstanding talent since her debut... she was able to jump into her rhythm throughout the race without being pressed... And to still have the strength to find another gear over the turf condition today—she is an exceptional filly to keep her speed right to the end."

Pedigree

References

2017 racehorse births
Racehorses bred in Japan
Racehorses trained in Japan
Thoroughbred family 3-l